Woodbury House may refer to:

Woodbury-Story House, Altadena, California, listed on the National Register of Historic Places (NRHP)
Woodbury House (Denver, Colorado), a Denver Landmark
Joseph A. Woodbury House, Greeley, Colorado, NRHP-listed in Weld County
Peter Woodbury House, Beverly, Massachusetts, NRHP-listed in Essex County
Woodbury House (Anoka, Minnesota), NRHP-listed in Anoka County
Levi Woodbury Homestead, Francetown, New Hampshire, NRHP-listed in Hillsborough County
Woodbury Friends' Meetinghouse, Woodbury, New Jersey, NRHP-listed in Gloucester County
Woodbury (Leetown, West Virginia), NRHP-listed in Jefferson County